Ralph Louis Engelstad (January 28, 1930 – November 26, 2002) was an American businessman who owned the Imperial Palace casino-hotels in Las Vegas and in Biloxi, Mississippi. He also owned the Kona Kai motel in Las Vegas, which later became the Klondike Hotel and Casino. He was also the donor for the construction of the $104 million Ralph Engelstad Arena for his alma mater, the University of North Dakota in Grand Forks, North Dakota, and another arena bearing his name in Thief River Falls, Minnesota. Engelstad was also a co-developer of the Las Vegas Motor Speedway. Engelstad was one of the very few independent casino-hotel owners in Las Vegas.

Early years
Engelstad was born on January 28, 1930, in Thief River Falls, Minnesota. He was one of five children born to Christian and Madeline (Thill) Engelstad. His grandfather, Peder was a Norwegian immigrant from Vang, Hedmark.

During high school, Engelstad worked a summer job at AGSCO farm supply company, where his father was a salesman. It was usually long and hard work, taking place on farms and requiring the workers to assemble steel buildings from morning to night.

In 1954, he graduated from the University of North Dakota (UND) with a degree in Business. While at UND, Engelstad also played goalie for the school hockey team and even received a tryout with the Chicago Blackhawks. After graduation, he went on to marry Betty Stocker of East Grand Forks. The two went on to have a daughter, Kris.

Business career 
In the 1950s, Engelstad founded his own construction company: Engelstad Construction. Engelstad became a millionaire at the age of twenty-nine, fulfilling his hope to become a millionaire by the age of thirty. In 1959, he moved to Las Vegas, Nevada, where his construction company had secured government contracts to build FHA homes.

In 1965, he purchased the Thunderbird Field airport and later acquired vacant land nearby. In 1967, he sold 145 acres, including the airport, to billionaire Howard Hughes for $2 million. Engelstad used the money to purchase the Kona Kai motel on the Las Vegas Strip. He sold the motel in 1975 for $1.2 million, and it would later become the Klondike Hotel and Casino.

In 1971, he purchased the Flamingo Capri Motel, also on the Las Vegas Strip. He added a casino in 1972, and later renamed the property to the Imperial Palace Hotel and Casino in 1979. By 1989, he was worth an estimated $300 million. In 1997, he opened a second Imperial Palace resort in Biloxi, Mississippi.

In 1996, Engelstad joined with Bill Bennett (owner of the Sahara Hotel and Casino) to build the Las Vegas Motor Speedway, which they later sold to Speedway Motorsports in 1998.

Philanthropy
The Engelstad Foundation was created in 2002 by Ralph and Betty Engelstad.

Since its inception, the foundation has provided more than $300 million in grants to organizations focused on animal compassion, at-risk individuals, education, historical preservation, medical research and support, people with disabilities and veterans.

Notable donations to organizations span Minnesota, Mississippi, Nevada, North Dakota, and Utah.

Minnesota 

$2.5 million to The Sacred Heart Foundation to fund a 10,865 square foot addition to the Sacred Heart School in East Grand Forks (2018)

Mississippi 

 $1.5 million toward Hurricane Katrina relief efforts. The Imperial Palace in Biloxi, Mississippi also opened its doors to FEMA workers and homeless employee families for months following the storm.

Nevada 

 $10 million gift to the St. Rose Dominican Health Foundation in support of an early support breast cancer program (2018)
$2.5 million to help build UNLV's hospitality school (2018)   
$3 million to the Blind Center of Nevada to help build its Visions of Greatness Center (2018)
$1.5 million to Las Vegas Area Council, Boy Scouts of America for Engelstad Scout Park (2016)    
$10 million to Three Square Food Bank's endowment in Las Vegas (2015)
$4.5 million to the Animal Foundation (2015)
$22 million had been given to Opportunity Village as of 2018
$2 million to support a public school-based community program created by the Latin Chamber of Commerce and Boys Town Nevada (2013)   
Millions to Las Vegas' Smith Center for the Performing Arts. In 2014 alone, there was a $2 million donation (2012-2014)
$12.6 million to support student scholarships at University of Nevada, Las Vegas (2009) 
$8.2 million to the College of Southern Nevada Foundation in Las Vegas to improve school's health sciences program (2008) 
An initial $5 million to the Boys and Girls Club to build a new facility, this includes a long-term donation plan that has money allotted for scholarship endowment (2008) 
$10 million to Bishop Gorman High School to fund a new campus (2003)

North Dakota 

 $250,000 to Farm Rescue to help farm and ranch families struck by unexpected crises in North Dakota (2018)   
 $3 million to Grand Forks' Community Violence Intervention Center benefitting its Safer Tomorrow Road Maps program (2018)
 $100 million to the University of North Dakota to build Ralph Engelstad Arena (1998)
$20 million endowment to the University of North Dakota (2007)

Items donated 

 Donated General George S. Patton Papers (1918-1944, 1997-1998) and portraits of the U.S. Supreme Court Justices to University of North Dakota valued at nearly $127.5 million

Utah 

 $6 million to build the Engelstad Shakespeare Theatre in Cedar City, Utah (2016) 

As of 2019, the Engelstad Foundation is run by trustees Betty Engelstad, Kris Engelstad McGarry and Jeffrey M. Cooper.

Namesakes 
 Ralph Engelstad Arena – Arena in Grand Forks, ND, originally known as the Winter Sports Center. Renamed in 1988, and closed in 2001.
 Ralph Engelstad Arena – A new arena in Grand Forks to replace the original. Opened in 2001, and utilized for major music events and University of North Dakota hockey and basketball.
 Ralph Engelstad Arena – Arena in Thief River Falls, MN, opened in 2003.
 Ralph & Betty Engelstad Clubhouse – A part of Boys & Girls Clubs of Southern Nevada, the clubhouse was built in 1994 and is located in central Las Vegas.   
 Ralph and Betty Engelstad Campus – The campus in Southwest Las Vegas houses many of Opportunity Village's most vital resources, including the Thomas & Mack Employment Resource Center and the Multi-Purpose Center for Arts & Life Skill Enrichment.    
 Ralph and Betty Engelstad School of Health Sciences – The first named school at the College of Southern Nevada, the building is home to multiple health science programs.    
Engelstad Scout Park – Opened in 2016, the Engelstad Scout Park serves as a meeting area for Las Vegas Area Council Boy Scout Meetings.
 Engelstad Family Foundation Event Terrace – Opened in 2018, the Hospitality Hall is home to University of Nevada, Las Vegas' (UNLV) hospitality program.   
 Engelstad Family Adoption Center – The Engelstad Family Adoption Center, opening late January 2019 as part of the Animal Foundation, will serve as a permanent home for safe pet adoptions in Las Vegas.

Awards 
Ralph Engelstad was honored with multiple awards throughout his life, including "National Employer of the Year" from the President's Committee on the Employment of People with Disabilities; "Employer of the Year" from the Southwest Business, Industry and Rehabilitation Association; and "Humanitarian of the Year Award" from the International Gaming & Business Exposition. In 2002, Engelstad was inducted into the North Dakota Entrepreneur Hall of Fame for his contributions to the construction, casino and entertainment industries.

Legacy/scholarships 

 UNLV School of Medicine – In 2018, 57 UNLV School of Medicine students were each awarded $100,000 scholarships.
 Fulfillment Fund Las Vegas – In 2015, there was a $10 million donation to Fulfillment Fund Las Vegas to help students at Chaparral High School, Del Sol Academy of the Performing Arts and Andre Agassi College Preparatory Academy achieve a higher education. 
 UNLV Scholarships – Awarded in 2009, this $12.6 million gift to UNLV established the Ralph and Betty Engelstad Scholars Program. 
 College of Southern Nevada – An $8.2 million gift to College of Southern Nevada in 2008 included $1 million allocated to scholarships for health and sciences.
Boys & Girls Club – In 2009, a $5 million gift to the Boys & Girls Club that included an allotment for annual college scholarships.
 University of North Dakota – A $20 million gift in 2007 to University of North Dakota established numerous athletic scholarships. These scholarships include:
 Ralph Engelstad Underrepresented Scholarship – Scholarships awarded to historically under-represented students (American Indian/Alaska Native, African American, Asian American, Hispanic American)    
 Ralph Engelstad Late Bloomer Scholarship – Scholarships awarded to new, incoming freshmen students

Nazi controversy
Engelstad was a controversial figure. He raised accusations of being sympathetic to Nazism owing to his collection of Nazi memorabilia stored in a private room, which he referred to as his "war room", within his Imperial Palace hotel-casino. After discovery of the memorabilia, Engelstad agreed to sell it rather than put it on display. In an apology letter to the Jewish Federation of Las Vegas, Engelstad said "I now feel I have done what I can and apologized for what I cannot do". In addition to the memorabilia he stored on display in his "war room", a printing plate was found within his hotel that was used to make bumper stickers that read "Hitler Was Right".

Hitler birthday parties
On April 20 in 1986 and 1988, he hosted parties to celebrate Adolf Hitler's birthday at his casino in Las Vegas  that featured bartenders in T-shirts reading "Adolf Hitler — European tour 1939-45". Because of this, in 1989, the Nevada Gaming Commission fined Engelstad $1.5 million "for actions that damaged the reputation and image of Nevada's gaming industry." Engelstad apologized publicly for the parties, saying they were "stupid, insensitive and held in bad taste", but the row was not to be his last controversial move.

Fighting Sioux controversy

"Tradition is the gentle fabric woven through time and experience which generates meaning, character, and identity to one and all. The Fighting Sioux logo, the Fighting Sioux uniforms, the aura of the Fighting Sioux tradition and the spirit of being a Fighting Sioux are of lasting value and immeasurable significance to our past, presence, and future." —Ralph Engelstad
 
Engelstad embroiled himself in the fight over the Fighting Sioux logo when he built a $104 million arena on the University of North Dakota campus for the Fighting Sioux hockey program. Midway in its construction, Engelstad threatened to withdraw funding if the long-standing nickname were to be changed. The logo was placed in thousands of instances in the arena, making the prospect of removal a costly measure. Later, Engelstad placed the stadium under private (rather than University) management and stipulated that the Fighting Sioux motif be kept indefinitely. An Engelstad family trust continues to own the arena and rents it to the University.

The North Dakota Board of Higher Education ruled on April 8, 2010, to retire the Fighting Sioux nickname in response to pressure from the NCAA. On February 8, 2012 the "repeal of the repeal" took place. After 17,213 North Dakota residents signed a petition bringing the debate over the nickname to a statewide vote, UND resumed use of the nickname. On June 14, 2012, the nickname was repealed again after a vote held on June 11, 2012, on whether to keep or retire the nickname resulted in 67.35% of North Dakota voters chose to retire the "Fighting Sioux" name and American Indian head logo as a result of negative consequences resulting from impending NCAA sanctions.

Death
After a lengthy affliction with lung cancer, Engelstad died at his home in Las Vegas on November 26, 2002.

Notes

1930 births
2002 deaths
University of North Dakota alumni
Sports in North Dakota
People from Thief River Falls, Minnesota
People from Grand Forks, North Dakota
People from the Las Vegas Valley